Chris Sheppard (born 16 March 1981) is an Australian former professional rugby league footballer, and former Chief Executive Officer of Queensland Cup club Northern Pride. 

Sheppard played at NRL level for the North Queensland Cowboys and the St. George Illawarra Dragons before finishing his career in the Queensland Cup with Northern Pride.

Background
Sheppard was born in Mareeba, Queensland, Australia.

Sheppard played all his early football career for Mareeba in the CDRL competition. Chris was part of the 1999 Gladiators team that won the premiership

Playing career
Sheppard made his NRL first grade debut for the Cowboys in their Round 4 clash against the Penrith Panthers in Cairns on 10 March 2001.

Sheppard took Northern Pride to victory in the 2010 Queensland Cup Final, winning the Duncan Hall Medal for his man-of-the-match performance in his last game before retirement.

References
3. https://www.qrl.com.au/news/2019/09/08/mareeba-awards-presentation-and-1999-team-reunion/

1981 births
Living people
Australian rugby league players
North Queensland Cowboys players
St. George Illawarra Dragons players
Northern Pride RLFC players
Rugby league five-eighths
Rugby league players from Queensland